Selvotta may refer to:

Selvotta (Formello), hamlet of Formello, in the Province of Rome, Lazio, Italy
Selvotta (Frascati), locality of Frascati, in the Province of Rome, Lazio, Italy
Selvotta (Rome), hamlet of Rome, Lazio, Italy
Selvotta (Rocca d'Evandro), locality of Rocca d'Evandro, in the Province of Caserta, Campania, Italy
Selvotta (Sesto Campano), locality of Sesto Campano, in the Province of Isernia, Molise, Italy